B. Home Phanh is a small village along Highway 6A in the South Asian country of Laos, settled near the border between Laos and Vietnam, with around 20-120 residents.

See also
Economy of Laos
History of Laos

References 

Populated places in Laos